2017–18 Eerste Klasse was a season in the Dutch Eerste Klasse league.

Champions 
Below section champions promoted to the Hoofdklasse, along with other teams.

Saturday 
 A West I: RKAV Volendam
 B West II: SC Feyenoord
 C South: VV DUNO
 D East: SVZW
 E North: VV Buitenpost

Sunday 
 A West I: Fortuna Wormerveer
 B West II: GVV Unitas
 C South I: SV AWC
 D South II: RKSV Minor
 E East: RKZVC
 F North: VV Hoogeveen

Saturday sections 
Participating clubs were:

A: West I 
 FC Aalsmeer 
 SV ARC 
 FC Breukelen
 Combinatie Sportclub Wilnis
 Forum Sport
 SV Marken
 Sportlust '46 
 Vitesse Delft 
 RKAV Volendam
 HVV Te Werve 
 RKVV Westlandia
 WV-HEDW
 XerxesDZB
 Zwaluwen '30

B: West II 
 VV Brielle
 Bruse Boys
 Door Combinatie Verkregen
 SV Deltasport Vlaardingen 
 SC Feyenoord
 VV Heerjansdam
 SV Heinenoord
 VV Kloetinge
 VV Nieuw-Lekkerland
 VV Nieuwenhoorn
 SV Oranje Wit
 VV Oude Maas
 VV SHO
 VVGZ

C: South 
 VV Bennekom
 Delta Sports '95
 DHSC
 DTS Ede
 VV DUNO
 GJS Gorinchem
 GRC '14 
 LRC Leerdam 
 VV De Merino's 
 VV Montfoort
 VV Sliedrecht
 SVL 
 VV Woudenberg 
 VV WNC

D: East 
 DETO Twenterand
 DOS '37
 ASV Dronten
 DZC '68
 Flevo Boys
 Go-Ahead Kampen 
 VV Hierden
 VV KHC 
 VV Nunspeet
 SDV Barneveld 
 SVZW Wierden 
 Vroomshoopse Boys 
 WHC Wezep 
 FC Zutphen

E: North 
 VV Balk 
 Be Quick Dokkum 
 Blauw Wit '34 
 VV Buitenpost 
 Drachtster Boys 
 VV Gorecht 
 VV Groningen 
 Noordscheschut 
 Olde Veste '54 
 Oranje Nassau Groningen 
 PKC '83 
 VEV '67 
 VV Winsum 
 ZMVV Zeerobben

Sunday sections 
Participating clubs were:

A: West I 
 AFC '34 
 AGB 
 VV Assendelft 
 RKVV DEM 
 HFC EDO 
 Fortuna Wormerveer 
 SV Hillegom 
 SV Hoofddorp 
 JOS Watergraafsmeer
 Legmeervogels 
 LSVV 
 FC Uitgeest 
 RKVV Velsen 
 AVV Zeeburgia

B: West II 
 VV BMT
 FC Boshuizen 
 DVV Delft
 SV Den Hoorn
 VV Hoogland
 RVV Kocatepe
 VV Nieuwerkerk
 Olympia Gouda 
 PSV Poortugaal
 RVC '33
 Spartaan '20
 GVV Unitas
 SV VELO 
 VOC

C: South I 
 VV Alverna
 SV AWC
 Best Vooruit
 RKVV Brabantia
 RKVV DESO
 SV DOSKO
 VV Gestel
 HVCH 
 RKSV Nemelaer
 Oirschot Vooruit
 Tilburg
 SV TOP
 Rood-Wit Willebrord
 SC 't Zand

D: South II 
 RKSV Bekkerveld
 VV Chevremont
 SV Deurne 
 VV Geldrop
 FC Hoensbroek
 RKSV Minor 
 VV Schaesberg 
 SC Susteren 
 VV De Valk
 Venlosche Boys
 SV Venray
 Wilhelmina '08
 RKSV Wittenhorst 
 ZSV

E: East 
 Sportclub Bemmel
 KSV BWO
 VV Heino 
 Longa '30
 SC NEC
 Quick 1888 
 vv Rigtersbleek
 RKZVC
 Rohda Raalte
 SV Schalkhaar
 RKVV STEVO 
 HVV Tubantia
 FC Winterswijk
 RKSV De Zweef

F: North 
 MVV Alcides 
 FC Assen 
 VV Bergum 
 VV Emmen 
 LAC Frisia 1883 
 FVC 
 GAVC 
 GRC Groningen 
 VV Hoogeveen 
 VV Nieuw Buinen 
 VV Noordster 
 VV Rolder Boys 
 SVBO 
 WVV 1896

References 

Eerste Klasse seasons
Netherlands
5